Tiliacora is a genus of flowering plants in the family Menispermaceae.

Species include:
Tiliacora acuminata
Tiliacora dinklagei
Tiliacora funifera
Tiliacora gabonensis
Tiliacora kenyensis
Tiliacora lehmbachii
Tiliacora racemosa
Tiliacora triandra

References

Menispermaceae
Menispermaceae genera